KBOZ may refer to:

 KBOZ (AM), a radio station (1090 AM) licensed to Bozeman, Montana, United States
 KBOZ-FM, a radio station (99.9 FM) licensed to Bozeman, Montana, United States